Tuesday  is the day of the week between Monday and Wednesday. According to international standard ISO 8601, Monday is the first day of the week; thus, Tuesday is the second day of the week. According to some commonly used calendars, however, especially in the United States, Sunday is the first day of the week, so Tuesday is the third day of the week. In Muslim countries, Saturday is the first day of the week and thus Tuesday is the fourth day of the week. 

The English name is derived from Old English Tiwesdæg and Middle English Tewesday, meaning "Tīw's Day", the day of Tiw or Týr, the god of single combat, and law and justice in Norse mythology. Tiw was equated with Mars in the interpretatio germanica, and the name of the day is a translation of Latin dies Martis.

Etymology

The name Tuesday derives from the Old English  and literally means "Tiw's Day". Tiw is the Old English form of  the Proto-Germanic god *Tîwaz, or Týr in Old Norse. *Tîwaz derives from the Proto-Indo-European base *dei-, *deyā-, *dīdyā-, meaning 'to shine', whence comes also such words as "deity".

The German Dienstag and Dutch dinsdag are derived from the Germanic custom of the thing, as Tiw / Týr also had a strong connection to the thing.

The Latin name  ("day of Mars") is equivalent to the Greek  ("day of Ares"). In most languages with Latin origins (Italian, French, Spanish, Catalan, Romanian, Galician, Sardinian, Corsican, but not Portuguese), the day is named after Mars, the Roman parallel of the Ancient Greek Ares.

In some Slavic languages the word Tuesday originated from Old Church Slavonic word  meaning "the second".

In the Nahuatl language, Tuesday is  meaning "day of Huitzilopochtli".

When added after the word  /  ( or ) it means "the third day".

Religious observances
In the Eastern Orthodox Church, Tuesdays are dedicated to Saint John the Baptist. The Octoechos contains hymns on this theme, arranged in an eight-week cycle, that are chanted on Tuesdays throughout the year.  At the end of Divine Services on Tuesday, the dismissal begins with the words: "May Christ our True God, through the intercessions of his most-pure Mother, of the honorable and glorious Prophet, Forerunner and Baptist John…"

In Hinduism, Tuesday is also a popular day for worshipping and praying to Hanuman and some also worship Kartikeya, Kali, and Ganesh. Many Hindus fast during Tuesday.  
Tuesday is also viewed as the day ruled by Mangala (Mars) in Hinduism.

Cultural references
In the Greek world, Tuesday (the day of the week of the Fall of Constantinople) is considered an unlucky day. The same is true in the Spanish-speaking world; it is believed that this is due to the association between Tuesday and Mars, the god of war and therefore related to death. For both Greeks and Spanish-speakers, the 13th of the month is considered unlucky if it falls on Tuesday, instead of Friday. In Judaism, on the other hand, Tuesday is considered a particularly lucky day, because in Bereshit (parashah), known in the Christian tradition as the first chapters of Genesis, the paragraph about this day contains the phrase "it was good" twice.

In the Thai solar calendar, the day is named for the Pali word for the planet Mars, which also means "Ashes of the Dead"; the color associated with Tuesday is pink.

In the folk rhyme Monday's Child, "Tuesday's child is full of grace".

Common occurrences

United States
Tuesday is the usual day for elections in the United States. Federal elections take place on the Tuesday after the first Monday in November; this date was established by a law of 1845 for presidential elections (specifically for the selection of the Electoral College), and was extended to elections for the House of Representatives in 1875 and for the Senate in 1914. Tuesday was the earliest day of the week which was practical for polling in the early 19th century: citizens might have to travel for a whole day to cast their vote, and would not wish to leave on Sunday which was a day of worship for the great majority of them. However, a bill was introduced in 2012 to move elections to weekends, with a co-sponsor stating that "by moving Election Day from a single day in the middle of the workweek to a full weekend, we are encouraging more working Americans to participate. Our democracy will be best served when our leaders are elected by as many Americans as possible."

Video games are commonly released on Tuesdays in the United States, this fact often attributed to the Sonic the Hedgehog 2 "Sonic 2s day" marketing campaign in 1992. DVDs and Blu-rays are released on Tuesday. Albums were typically released on Tuesdays as well, but this has changed to Fridays globally in 2015.

Australia 
In Australia, the board of the Reserve Bank of Australia meets on the first Tuesday of every month except January. The federal government hands down the federal budget on the second Tuesday in May, the practice since 1994 (except in 1996 and 2016). The Melbourne Cup is held each year on the first Tuesday in November.

Astrology
In astrology, Tuesday is aligned by the planet Mars and the astrological signs of Aries and Scorpio.

Named days 
 Black Tuesday, in the United States, refers to Tuesday, October 29, 1929, part of the great Stock Market Crash of 1929. This was the Tuesday after Black Thursday.
 Easter Tuesday is the Tuesday within the Octave of Easter.
 Patch Tuesday is the second Tuesday of every month when Microsoft releases patches for their products. Some system administrators call this day Black Tuesday.
 Shrove Tuesday (also called Mardi Gras – Fat Tuesday) precedes the first day of Lent in the Western Christian calendar.
 Super Tuesday is the day many American states hold their presidential primary elections.
 Twosday (portmanteau of two and Tuesday) is the name given to Tuesday, February 22, 2022, and an unofficial one-time secular observance held on that day.

References
Notes

Sources
 Grimm, Jacob. 1875–78. Deutsche Mythologie.  Fourth ed., curated by Elard Hugo Meyer,  3 vols. Berlin: F. Dümmler. Reprinted Darmstadt: Wissenschaftliche Buchgesellschaft, 1965.

External links

 
2 Tuesday
Ares